is a biography series produced by Tsuburaya Productions created to commemorate the 10th anniversary of  series lineup that started since Ultraman Ginga. The show premiered in January 28, 2023 on TV Tokyo, effectively a week after the end of Ultraman Decker.

Synopsis
As the force of evil reaches the Land of Light in Nebula M78, the record of the New Generation Ultraman became lost. The  is entrusted to Ultraman Zero, alongside the message which directs him to regain the lost  and the bonds with the New Generation Ultras.

Episodes

Cast
: 
: 
: 
:

Theme song
STARS
Lyrics: TAKERU, 
Composition & Arrangement: 
Artist: NEW GENERATION STARS with Voyager

References

External links
Ultraman New Generation Stars at TV Tokyo 

2023 Japanese television series debuts
Ultra Series
Upcoming television series
TV Tokyo original programming